Stephen Francis Smith (born 22 July 1985) is a British former professional boxer who competed from 2008 to 2019. He challenged twice for a super-featherweight world championship; the IBF and WBA titles, both in 2016. At regional level he held multiple championships, including the British and Commonwealth featherweight titles and the British super-featherweight title between 2010 and 2013.

Amateur career
A distinguished amateur with over 150 fights, Smith represented Rotunda ABC and achieved fame at the 2006 Commonwealth Games in Melbourne when he defeated Mehrullah Lassi in the final to win Commonwealth Gold.  He also won a bronze medal at the 2006 European Amateur Boxing Championships in Plovdiv, losing in the semi-final of that tournament to Albert Selimov.  He also won the ABA championships in 2005 and 2006, the Four Nations in 2006 and Gold at the 2007 Commonwealth Federation Championships held in Liverpool.

At the 2007 World Amateur Boxing Championships in Chicago, US he was defeated in the first round losing 20:14 to German Marcel Herfurth, in a tournament in which he had been expected to perform well.

Professional career
Smith turned professional on 21 June 2008 and stopped Shaun Walton in the 3rd round at the National Indoor Arena in Birmingham. Like his brother he signed for Warren's Sports Network and has since had a further 11 fights, all wins.

Smith vs. Simpson 
Smith became Commonwealth featherweight champion after he edged a points verdict over John Simpson in a tight scrap in Glasgow on 4 September 2010. A 114–116, 116–114, 116–112 decision was announced following a gruelling battle. During the re-match on 27 April 2011, Smith once again won on points with judges scores of 114–114, 115–114 and 118–112. However Simpson argued the judges scores were off target.

Smith vs. Selby 
Smith fought the Welsh challenger Lee Selby on 17 September 2011, in a British and Commonwealth title defence at the Olympia, Liverpool where he was stopped in the 8th round by a Selby left hand.

Since losing to Selby, Smith fought Arpad Vass in the Olympiahalle in Munich, Germany on 18 February 2012 winning via KO in Round 1. On 2 March 2012 Smith fought Ben Jones at The Troxy in London winning that fight via TKO in Round 1. On 1 June 2012 Smith fought for the third time in 2012 against Jose Luis Graterol	at the York Hall winning again this time on points over 8 rounds.

Smith was due to fight on 8 March 2013 on the undercard of Yaqub Kareem v Paul Butler at the Liverpool Olympia however the fight was rescheduled to 12 April 2013. On 8 April 2013 Frank Warren confirmed that the event had been cancelled.

Smith fought for the first time in 13 months on 28 June 2013 against Eddie Nebitt of Belfast at the Liverpool Olympia and won via KO in Round 1. In his next fight on 17 August 2013 against Gary Buckland at the Motorpoint Arena in Cardiff, Smith won the British Super featherweight title after he KO'd Buckland in Round 5.

Promotions change
In October 2013 Smith announced he was breaking his contract with Frank Warren and signing with Eddie Hearn's Matchroom organisation. Warren took action through the courts and with the British Boxing Board of Control against Smith's contract termination.

On 31 October 2013 Smith was ordered by the British Boxing Board of Control to fight on 7 December 2013 in Liverpool under the Frank Warren promotion, Smith refused and relinquished his belt, the following day Smith was suspended by the BBBoC pending further investigation into his and Eddie Hearn's conduct in the switch.

On 15 November 2013 Smith was handed back his licence by the BBBoC and his first fight under Matchroom promotions was confirmed to be against Sergio Manuel Medina on the undercard of the Carl Froch v George Groves at Manchester's Phones 4u arena on 23 November 2013, Smith won the fight via KO in Round 8 and won the vacant WBC International Silver super featherweight title.

Smith vs. Sosa 
On 12 November, 2016, Smith fought Jason Sosa. Sosa won the fight comfortably on all three scorecards, 117-110, 116-111 and 116-112.

Smith vs. Vargas 
On 17 August, 2017, Smith fought Francisco Vargas, who was ranked #2 by the WBC at super featherweight. Vargas won the fight in the ninth round via a technical decision.

Professional boxing record

Personal life
Stephen Smith is the younger brother of the boxer; Paul Smith, and the older brother of the boxers; Liam Smith, and Callum Smith.

References

External links
Bio
Euro

Stephen Smith - Profile, News Archive & Current Rankings at Box.Live 

1985 births
Living people
Featherweight boxers
Commonwealth Games gold medallists for England
Boxers at the 2006 Commonwealth Games
Boxers from Liverpool
English male boxers
Commonwealth Games medallists in boxing
Medallists at the 2006 Commonwealth Games